Damian Charles Hurley (born 4 April 2002) is an English actor and model. He is the son of actress Elizabeth Hurley and American businessman Steve Bing.

Career
In July 2016, it was announced that Hurley had been cast as Prince Hansel von Liechtenstein in The Royals, an E! series which stars his mother as the Queen of the United Kingdom. Hansel plays a reality TV star in the December 2016 episode "Aye, There's the Rub". He reprised the role in the April 2018 episode "My News Shall Be the Fruit to That Great Feast".

In September 2018, Hurley was signed by model agency Tess Management.

In July 2019, Hurley fronted Pat McGrath’s ‘Sublime Perfection’ campaign. Hurley told Vogue, “It feels strange being referred to as a model” before explaining, “When I was 17, I got a call saying that [fashion photographer] Steven Meisel wanted me in New York the next day to front a new campaign. I’d never modelled before, but in a moment of madness I agreed, flew out, did the shoot and made it back to school in time for my first class on Monday.”

In July 2020, Hurley signed with IMG models; whose clients include Kate Moss, Gisele Bündchen, Cara Delevingne, and Gigi and Bella Hadid. Since then, he has worked with giants of fashion, including Mert and Marcus, Katie Grand and Luigi and Iango.

Personal life
Hurley was born in Portland Hospital, London to actress Elizabeth Hurley and American businessman Steve Bing. Although Bing initially denied paternity, a DNA test subsequently confirmed him as the father. In a court settlement of his child support obligations, Bing agreed to pay £1.8 million in annual instalments of £100,000 for Hurley, although his mother declined to accept the payments.

Hurley's godfathers include Hugh Grant, David Beckham, Elton John and Denis Leary.

Hurley grew up in Gloucestershire with his mother and her then-spouse Indian business tycoon Arun Nayar.

Hurley later lived part time in Australia because of his mother's relationship with Australian cricket player Shane Warne.

References

External links

2002 births
21st-century English male actors
English male soap opera actors
English people of American-Jewish descent
English people of German-Jewish descent
English people of Russian-Jewish descent
English people of Serbian descent
English people of Croatian descent
English people of Irish descent
Male actors from London
Living people
Place of birth missing (living people)
English male child actors
English male models